The West African Nile monitor (Varanus niloticus stellatus) is a species of monitor lizard that is native to West African forests and adjacent savannah (east to northern Cameroon). It has also been introduced to Florida, United States, where it is considered invasive.

This cryptic species has traditionally been included in the Nile monitor (V. niloticus), but from 1997 to 2015 it was often considered as the western population of the ornate monitor (V. ornatus). Compared to the other members of the Nile monitor species complex (which also includes the ornate monitor of Central Africa), the West African Nile monitor has a genetic sequence divergence of more than 8%, meaning that they separated about 7.7 million years ago. This is a larger divergence than between humans and chimpanzees. Despite this, the Reptile Database continues to place it within the Nile monitor, but do note that this broad species definition includes distinctive clades.

References

Varanus
Reptiles of West Africa
Reptiles of Cameroon
Reptiles described in 1802
Taxa named by François Marie Daudin